Stress is an album by the Jamaican musician Daddy Freddy, released in 1991. It made Billboards Top R&B Albums chart. Daddy Freddy incorporated samples from rock bands like the Rolling Stones and Led Zeppelin. "Nuff Respect" is a version of the Otis Redding song. "Ragga House (All Night Long)" samples Stephen Bishop's "On and On".

Critical reception

The Baltimore Sun called the album "derivative, but fun," writing that "unlike a lot of 'ragamuffin' rap, Daddy Freddy's work tends to play down the reggae-based style's impenetrable patois and sing-song cadences." The Calgary Herald noted that "Freddy is a ragamuffin powerhouse early on, blending the street-wise sounds of urban America with the woeful angst of the Kingston slums." The Dayton Daily News wrote that "there's a grittiness on Stress, not unlike that found on hard-core urban American raps."

Track listing
CD
"Intro" - 0:13
"Go Freddy Go" - 5:06
"Talking Beatbox" - 5:07
"Born Christian" - 4:02
"Haul & Paul Badboy" - 0:19
"Daddy Freddy's In Town" - 5:07
"Ragga House (All Night Long)" - 4:57
"Article Don" - 4:23
"Up To Full Speed" - 0:20
"Nuff Respect" - 4:52
"Rockin' With The Best" - 6:17
Featuring - Dale Joyner
"Roughneck Nuh Ramp" - 4:25
Featuring - Tenor Fly
"The Crown" - 5:10
"Go Freddy Go (Remix)" - 5:09
Featuring - Tenor Fly
Remix - Simon Harris
"We Are The Champions" - 5:29
Featuring - Asher D

12" vinylSide A"Intro" - 0:14
"Go Freddy Go" - 5:06
Featuring - Tenor Fly
"Talking Beatbox" - 5:07
"Born Christian" - 4:02
"Haul And Paul Badboy" - 0:19
"Daddy Freddy's In Town" - 5:07
"Ragga House (All Night Long)" - 4:57
Featuring - Simon Harris
"Article Don" - 4:23Side B'
"Up To Full Speed" - 0:20
"Nuff Respect" - 5:01
"Rockin' With The Best" - 6:17
Featuring - Dale Joyner
"Roughneck Nuh Ramp" - 4:25
Featuring - Tenor Fly
"The Crown" - 5:10
"Go Freddy Go (Remix)" - 5:00
Featuring - Tenor Fly
"We Are The Champions" - 5:44
Featuring - Asher D

References

Daddy Freddy albums
1991 albums
Chrysalis Records albums